The Šišatovac Monastery is a Serb Orthodox monastery situated on the Fruška Gora mountain in the northern Serbia, in the province of Vojvodina. The foundation of the monastery is ascribed to the refugee monks from the Serbian monastery of Žiča. The first reliable facts illustrating the life of the monastery date back to the mid 16th century. A great benefactor of Šišatovac Monastery was Sekula Vitković (1687-1754) who in 1731 was appointed regimental commander of the Danube Serbian Militia. The building dates from the 16th century. It was through a donation by Vikentije Popović-Hadžilovac, the Bishop of Vršac, that the new, extant church building was constructed in 1778. The iconostasis is the work of the famed Baroque painter Grigorije Davidović-Obšić.

During World War II, the monastery and its church suffered heavy damages.

Šišatovac Monastery was declared Monument of Culture of Exceptional Importance in 1990, and it is protected by Republic of Serbia.

See also
Monasteries of Fruška Gora - Fruškać
Monasteries of Fruška Gora
Monument of Culture of Exceptional Importance
Tourism in Serbia
List of Serb Orthodox monasteries

References

External links 

 Šišatovac monastery - Fruškać
More about the monastery

Serbian Orthodox monasteries in Vojvodina
Cultural Monuments of Exceptional Importance (Serbia)
Christian monasteries established in the 16th century
16th-century establishments in Serbia